Soglio may refer to:

Soglio, Piedmont, a comune in the Province of Asti, Italy
Soglio, Switzerland, a municipality in the canton of Graubünden